Marika Domińczyk (born 1980) is a Polish-American actress who became best known in the United States for her role as Dr. Eliza Minnick on Grey's Anatomy, which she originated in its 13th season.

Personal life
Marika Domińczyk is one of three daughters born to Aleksandra and Miroslaw "Mirek" Domińczyk. She immigrated to the United States as a child. Her father was one of the leaders in the Polish Solidarity movement. She is the younger sister of actress Dagmara Dominczyk whose husband is actor Patrick Wilson.

Domińczyk became engaged to actor Scott Foley in 2006. In June 2007, the two wed in a private ceremony in Hawaii. They have three children: daughter Malina (b. November 2009) and sons Keller (b. April 2012) and Konrad (b. November 13, 2014).

Career

In 2004, Domińczyk appeared in the short-lived television series The Help, which also starred Mindy Cohn and Antonio Sabàto, Jr. The following year, she appeared as Bernadette in the 2005 movie The 40-Year-Old Virgin. From 2006-2007, she guest-starred on the ABC's Brothers & Sisters as Tyler Altamirano. She reprised her role in the last two episodes of the show's fifth season. Despite her being of Polish extraction, her looks have often led to her being cast in Hispanic roles, such as Anna in The Help and, most recently, as South American agent Isabella in Get Smart's Bruce and Lloyd: Out of Control. She appeared in Who Do You Love?, the Las Vegas episode "3 Babes, 100 Guns, and a Fat Chick" (2008) as a bounty hunter, and Danny's Marine Sergeant in Iraq, and as a Russian informant to Cool Breeze, played by her husband Scott Foley, in The Unit. She also starred in National Lampoon's Bag Boy.

Domińczyk played the role of Lara in the film I Hope They Serve Beer in Hell. She was then signed for the recurring role, in ABC's drama series Grey's Anatomy, of Dr. Eliza Minnick, an orthopedic surgeon and residency-instruction consultant who became a love interest for Jessica Capshaw's character of Dr. Arizona Robbins, which role she originated as the program's thirteenth season began. Ultimately, Dr. Minnick's approach to surgical-residency programs led to her being fired from the hospital, and Domińczyk was, herself, released from the cast. In 2019, Domińczyk recurred as Tina Marek on ABC's Whiskey Cavalier, which starred her real-life husband Scott Foley.

Filmography

Film

Television

References

External links

American film actresses
American television actresses
Polish emigrants to the United States
21st-century American actresses
Living people
Place of birth missing (living people)
1980 births